Terinaea is a genus of longhorn beetles of the subfamily Lamiinae, containing the following species:

 Terinaea atrofusca Bates, 1884
 Terinaea imasakai Hayashi, 1983
 Terinaea rufonigra Gressitt, 1940

References

Desmiphorini